Hora is a surname. Notable people with the surname include:

 Ioan Hora (born 1988), Romanian footballer
 Josef Hora (1891–1945), Czech poet, literary critic, and journalist
 Sunder Lal Hora (1896–1955), Indian ichthyologist
 Heinrich Hora (born 1931) German-Australian theoretical physicist